Evelyn Dick ( MacLean, born October 13, 1920) was a Canadian woman convicted of murder until her pardon in 1985. Her trials remain among the most sensationalized events in Canadian criminal history.

Background and case

Dick was born in Beamsville, Ontario to Scottish immigrants Donald and Alexandra MacLean. A year after her birth, her family moved to 214 Rosslyn Avenue, Hamilton, Ontario. Her father worked for the Hamilton Street Railway (HSR) as a streetcar conductor

She was suspected of and arrested for murder after five local children in Hamilton, Ontario found the torso of her missing estranged Russian husband, known as John Dick. His head and limbs had been sawn from his body and — as later evidence revealed — were disposed of in the furnace of her home at 32 Carrick Avenue.

She was defended in her first murder trial in 1946 by J.J. Sullivan, convicted and sentenced to hang, but her lawyer J.J. Robinette appealed her case and won an eventual acquittal. In the meantime, however, a partly mummified body of a male infant was found in her attic, encased in cement in an old suitcase. The infant was identified as her son Peter David White.

She was tried for the baby's murder in 1947 and sentenced to life in prison, but was paroled in 1958 after serving only eleven years in Kingston's Prison for Women, with a new identity and job and disappeared from public view and her file was permanently sealed after her 1985 pardon.

In the media and popular culture
A well known school yard song, (with a double entendre) at the time of the murders went as follows:

You cut off his legs...
You cut off his arms...
You cut off his head...
How could you Mrs Dick?
How could you Mrs Dick?

The Forgotten Rebels used these lyrics for the song "Evelyn Dick" on their (Untitled) album in 1989.

In 2001 Canadian author Brian Vallée authored The Torso Murder: The Untold Story of Evelyn Dick a book focusing on Dick's murder trial and subsequent disappearance. A 2002 television film, Torso: The Evelyn Dick Story, suggests Dick protected her parents, who were also viable suspects in the murder of her baby and husband, and that she was sexually abused by her father and exploited by both parents (especially by her mother) to provide them a higher standing and income. The movie was originally scheduled to be aired on September 11, 2001, but was delayed until March 18, 2002 due to the terrorist attacks on the original air date. The case was also the subject of the 2005 film noir musical, Black Widow.

References

Sources

Further reading
 Campbell, Marjorie Freeman. Bloody Matrimony: Evelyn Dick and the Torso Murder Case. Toronto, Ont.: Penguin Books Canada, 1992, cop. 1974. N.B.: On verso of t.p.: "First published 1974 by Macmillan of Canada in a hardcover edition, entitled Torso: the Evelyn Dick Case."  pbk.

External links
 Evelyn Dick - The 'Torso' Murder
 Torso Murder (Evelyn Dick) series in the Brian Vallée archival fonds

1920 births
20th-century criminals
Canadian female murderers
Canadian people convicted of murder
Canadian prisoners sentenced to life imprisonment
Filicides in Canada
People acquitted of murder
People convicted of murder by Canada
People from Hamilton, Ontario
People from the Regional Municipality of Niagara
People paroled from life sentence
Possibly living people
Prisoners sentenced to life imprisonment by Canada
Prisoners sentenced to death by Canada